Christian Bakkerud (3 November 1984 – 11 September 2011) was a Danish racing driver, who competed in the 2007 and 2008 GP2 Series seasons, albeit hindered by a recurrent back injury. Prior to GP2 he competed in British Formula 3 and Formula BMW.

Career

Formula BMW
Bakkerud competed in Formula BMW from 2002 to 2004, joining the British version of the series in the latter year after two seasons in Germany.

Formula Three
Bakkerud competed in British Formula 3 in 2005 and 2006. Having finished seventh in the championship in 2005, he improved to sixth place in 2006, and also scored his first series win for Carlin at Mugello in 2006 - arguably his career highlight. During this time he also competed in the Macau Grand Prix and the Ultimate Masters of Formula Three race.

GP2 Series

Bakkerud took part in the 2007 GP2 Series season for the DPR team, paired with Spaniard Andy Soucek. The season was disappointing, as Bakkerud failed to score any points. He also suffered back injuries, trapping nerves whilst racing on two separate occasions.

He moved to the Super Nova team for the 2008 GP2 Asia Series, reinforcing his unlucky reputation by retiring from all but three of the races. He remained for the 2008 GP2 Series proper, he suffered a recurrence of his back injury after a collision with Ben Hanley in the first race. He was replaced by Soucek whilst he recovered, and made his return to the cockpit at Monaco, after missing the championship round at Istanbul. He crashed at the start of the sprint race at Monaco, briefly going airborne after hitting Kamui Kobayashi. He did not suffer a recurrence of his back injury despite a heavy landing.  However, the injury flared up once more following a testing session, and he withdrew from the rest of the season on medical grounds. He was replaced by Soucek.

DTM

In 2009, Bakkerud raced in the Deutsche Tourenwagen Masters in a two-year-old Audi A4 for Futurecom-TME.

Le Mans
Paired with Christijan Albers and Giorgio Mondini, he finished ninth overall and in class.

Retirement
Bakkerud retired from driving following the 2010 Le Mans race. In the year prior to his death, he worked as an import manager at a shipping company.

Death
On 10 September 2011, Bakkerud was involved in a car crash at the Tibbet's Corner roundabout at Putney Heath, near Wimbledon Common. He died a day later, in St George's Hospital, from his injuries. He was driving an Audi RS6 at the time of the accident; a police investigation followed. The car then flipped over the barrier, fell down a steep  grass incline before smashing through the steel fence separating the bridleway and pedestrian/cyclist underpass routes. Crash investigators used yellow spray paint to mark skid and impact points on the road and where the car flipped over the barrier. The straight skid marks showed his car crossed from nearside to inside lane, as the road veered left at the roundabout entry, before it made a glancing blow on a heavy steel crash barrier prior to the barrier impact some six metres later.

Within a week a large number of flower bouquets were left at the location where the car came to rest. Police had also erected a yellow sign appealing for witnesses, which stated the accident occurred at about 6am on 10 September.

Formula One team HRT, led by Colin Kolles, added a tribute to Bakkerud to the livery of their cars during the 2011 Singapore Grand Prix weekend. McLaren driver Lewis Hamilton also paid tribute to Bakkerud by wearing a helmet featuring his initials.

Racing record

Complete GP2 Series results
(key) (Races in bold indicate pole position) (Races in italics indicate fastest lap)

Complete GP2 Asia Series results
(key) (Races in bold indicate pole position) (Races in italics indicate fastest lap)

Complete DTM results
(key) (Races in bold indicate pole position) (Races in italics indicate fastest lap)

24 Hours of Le Mans results

References
Career statistics from driverdb.com, retrieved January 24, 2007.

External links
Official website

1984 births
2011 deaths
GP2 Series drivers
Danish racing drivers
Deutsche Tourenwagen Masters drivers
Formula BMW ADAC drivers
Formula BMW UK drivers
British Formula Three Championship drivers
24 Hours of Le Mans drivers
GP2 Asia Series drivers
European Le Mans Series drivers
Asian Le Mans Series drivers
Road incident deaths in London
Carlin racing drivers
Sportspeople from Copenhagen
Audi Sport drivers
Kolles Racing drivers
Super Nova Racing drivers
David Price Racing drivers
Team Rosberg drivers